Roger Akelius is a Swedish business magnate. He is the founder of Akelius Residential Property AB, one of Europe's largest real estate companies.

Early life and education 
Akelius grew up in Stora Mellby, a small village located between Trollhättan and Alingsås. His first job was at a dairy farm.

Akelius studied engineering and mathematics at Lund University. Between 1969 and 1974, he worked as a lecturer at Chalmers University of Technology and IBM Svenska. In 1969, he published a book on computer programming, Modern Cobol, which was republished in four editions between 1969 and 1974. This was followed by another twenty textbooks in Assembly and BASIC, as well as various other technical manuals on operating systems and project management.

Career

Financial advisor 
In 1974, Akelius founded Akelius Skatt, which provided financial advice and services, particularly in mortgaging premium bonds. In 1982, Akelius wrote and published Akelius Tax, which explained how people could legally reduce their taxes. The book was a best-seller, and Akelius earned a reputation as a "Dr. Ruth of Swedish Tax Avoidance". In 1985, Akelius, together with Sievert Larsson, developed a computer program for tax declarations and calculations. The computer program was stated to be the main part of Akelius' income. Akelius Skatt employed roughly twenty lawyers and thirty programmers. Akelius sold the company in 1994, pivoting to real estate.

Real estate 
In 1994, Roger Akelius founded Akelius Residential Property AB. The first property purchases were made in Gothenburg, Helsingborg and Trollhättan.

In 2017, Akelius Residential Property AB was named Sweden's second largest property owner with a value of SEK 66 billion, 500 employees and over 50,000 rental apartments in Sweden, Germany, the USA, Canada, England and France. The company owns properties in Berlin, London, Paris, Stockholm, Toronto and New York. The company's business concept is to buy, renovate, and manage residential properties internationally.  

In 2020, the United Nations Human Rights Council accused the company for abusing human rights, leaving tenants in unsafe construction sites without access to running water or heating for months. Akelius rejected the findings, stating that the United Nations favored "Cuba politics".

Akelius Foundation 
Akelius has donated 90 percent of earnings from Akelius Residential Property AB to his non-profit charity, Akelius Foundation. The foundation is the world's largest donor to SOS Children's Villages, donating a total of over SEK 700 million to the organization. 

During the month of December 2016, Akelius matched every krona donated to Doctors Without Borders. A total of SEK 254 million was donated to the organization, of which Akelius accounted for SEK 127 million. The fundraising campaign meant a new Swedish fundraising record for Doctors Without Borders for one month.  

In 2020, the foundation was criticized for tax avoidance. Akelius denied these claims, stating that he has paid "full taxes".

Personal life 
Akelius has lived abroad since 1980, including in Cyprus, London, Berlin, Annecy and Almuñécar. He currently lives in The Bahamas. 

Akelius has three children. His daughter, Anna-Maria Fuxén, was elected to the board of directors of Akelius Residential Property AB in 2003. He fired her in 2010 after she became a mother, stating to Swedish daily newspaper Expressen that "it is not possible to sit at a board meeting and breastfeed." That same week, Akelius sued her, demanding SEK 6.4 million back from her over a disagreement on whether the sum was a gift or a loan.

In a 2020 documentary by SVT, Akelius described himself as a "super capitalist". In an interview with Swedish politlcal magazine OmVärlden, Akelius argued that Sweden should support more refugees, and stated that the world needed more billionaires, as "they are the only ones that reduce poverty".

References

Living people
1945 births
Swedish businesspeople
Swedish philanthropists